A Friend of the Deceased is a 1997 Ukrainian drama film directed by Viacheslav Kryshtofovych. The film was selected as the Ukrainian entry for the Best Foreign Language Film at the 70th Academy Awards, but was not accepted as a nominee.

Plot 
The era of "wild capitalism" was gaining momentum when Anatoly was abandoned by his wife. He was young, handsome, and intelligent, with knowledge of a foreign language, but for some reason he did not fit into modern life, which was completely incomprehensible to him. A meeting with his former classmate Dima, who was successfully trading in a commercial kiosk, became his Ariadne's thread in the world of new morality. Life becomes like a movie. Anatoliy's rash and frivolous act became the first link in a chain of events that resulted in the murder of a man who was himself a hired killer. This man's little son called Anatoliy dad… How will Anatoliy behave after that? Will he become a father to the boy or will he take the place of the killer?

Cast
 Aleksandr Lazarev Jr. as Anatoliy
 Anzhelika Nevolina as Katia
 Elena Korikova as Maryna
 Tetiana Kryvytska Stang Lund as Lena / Vika
 Yevheniy Pashin as Dima
 Serhiy Romaniuk as Ivan
 Anatoliy Mateshko as Borys
 Rostislav Yankovsky as Ihor Lvovych

Film crew 

 Director of Photography: Vyacheslav Kryshtofovych
 Screenwriter: Andriy Kurkov
 Director of Photography: Vilen Kalyuta
 Production designer: Roman Adamovych
 Composer: Vladimir Hronsky
 Sound director: Heorhiy Stremovsky

See also
 List of submissions to the 70th Academy Awards for Best Foreign Language Film
 List of Ukrainian submissions for the Academy Award for Best Foreign Language Film

References

External links
 

1997 films
1997 drama films
Ukrainian drama films
Ukrainian-language films
Films based on works by Ukrainian writers